The Finals, formerly known as World Group, is the highest level of Billie Jean King Cup competition in 2020–21. It was originally scheduled to be played on indoor clay courts at the László Papp Budapest Sports Arena in Budapest, Hungary from 14 until 19 April 2020, but was postponed due to COVID-19. The new venue was established to be the O2 Arena, in Prague, on indoor hard (Rebound Ace) court. The ties were contested in a best-of-three rubbers format and are played on one day. There were two singles matches, followed by a single doubles tie.

France were the defending champions, but were eliminated in the round robin stage, losing both their ties.

The Russian Tennis Federation won the title, defeating Switzerland in the final, 2–0.

Participating teams
12 nations took part in the Finals, formerly known as World Group. The qualification was as follows:
 2 finalists of the previous edition
 1 host nation
 1 wild card
 8 winners of a qualifier round, in February 2020

Team nominations
SR = Singles ranking, DR = Doubles ranking. Rankings are as of 1 November 2021.

Format
The 12 teams are divided in four round robin groups of three teams each. The four group winners will qualify for the semifinals.

Group stage

Overview
T = Ties, M = Matches, S = Sets

Group A

France vs. Canada

RTF vs. Canada

France vs. RTF

Group B

Belarus vs. Belgium

Australia vs. Belgium

Australia vs. Belarus

Group C

Spain vs. Slovakia

United States vs. Slovakia

United States vs. Spain

Group D

Czech Republic vs. Germany

Germany vs. Switzerland

Czech Republic vs. Switzerland

Knockout stage

Bracket

Semifinals

RTF vs. United States

Australia vs. Switzerland

Final

RTF vs. Switzerland

References

External links
Official website

Finals
Billie Jean King Cup Finals
Billie Jean King Cup Finals
Sports competitions in Prague
Fed Cup Finals
Billie Jean King Cup Finals